The Sarim were a faction of scholars prominent in Korean politics between the 15th and the 18th centuries.

Sarim may also refer to:
 Sarim (angel), a class of angels in the Bible
 Sarim (dessert), a dessert in Thai cuisine

People with the name 
 Sarim Momin (born 1978), Indian screenplay writer, film director, and lyricist
 Shir Sarim, 16th-century Kurdish leader

See also 
 Beth Sarim, a mansion in San Diego, California